Agim Hysen Murati (8 March 1953 – 15 September 2005) was an Albanian international football striker. During his career, Murati was recognised for "his ability to head the ball in the penalty area".

Playing career

Early years
Agim Hysen Murati was born on 8 March 1953 in Shijak, the son of Hysen and Myhrie Murati. He was raised in Shijak and attended the high school. He developed a passion for the sport from an early age, joining Erzeni academy in 1967.

Club
Murati begun his footballing career with his hometown club Erzeni, making his way through ranks before joining Partizani Tirana in 1970 as a 17-year old. This transfer occurred after Murati impressed the manager Loro Boriçi in a friendly match against Shkëndija Tiranë, in which he scored a header.

He is known for having been the best goalscorer of the Albanian Superliga during the 1976–77, 1977–78 and 1978–79 seasons with 12, 14 and 14 goals respectively.

Murati is the only Partizani Tirana player to have score a hat-trick in the capital derby versus Tirana; the hat-trick came on 28 December 1980 in a 3–2 win. All the goals were headers scored inside 27 minutes.

He is also known for the goal scored against Scotland's Celtic in the 1979–80 European Cup. His goal scored in the first leg on 19 September gave Partizani the 1–0, but they lost 4–1 in the second leg and were eventually eliminated 4–2 on aggregate.

International
Murati was a member of the Albania national football team. He earned his first international cap on 10 October 1973 by playing the second half of a 1–0 home win versus Finland.

Style of play

Murati's most known skill was his heading ability; he is known to have scored more than 75% of his goals with headers.

Managerial career
After ending his career, Murati continued his football career now as a manager; he coached the senior team of Erzeni for a short time and before that has also trained the youngster players in Tirana and Shijak.

Personal life
Murati married Diana Murati in 1978; she gave birth to the couple's first children Donald on 13 October 1979. On 15 September 1983, Murati's wife gave birth to the couple's second children, a daughter named Anjeza.

He died on 15 September 2005 due to a heavy illness. His brother, Shkëlqim Murati, is a former player and manager.

Legacy
On 27 December 2009, more than four years after his death, Murati was honoured with "Legend of Albanian Football" award. He was also received the Silver order of Naim Frashëri Title and Meritorious Master of Sport.

International statistics
Source:

Honours

Club
Partizani Tirana
Albanian Superliga: 1978–79, 1980–81
Albanian Cup: 1979–80

Individual
Albanian Superliga top goalscorer: 1976–77, 1977–78, 1978–79

References

External links
Football Database profile

1953 births
2005 deaths
People from Shijak
Footballers from Durrës
Albanian footballers
Association football forwards
Albania international footballers
KF Erzeni players
FK Partizani Tirana players
Kategoria Superiore players
Albanian football managers